Ignaty Yulianovich Krachkovsky (Russian: Игна́тий Юлиа́нович Крачко́вский (4 (16) March 1883, Vilnius — 24 January  1951, Leningrad) was a Russian and Soviet Arabist, academician of the Russian Academy of Science (since 1921; since 1925 Academy of Science of the USSR).

Krachkovsky was one of the founders of the Soviet school of Arab studies.

Krachkovsky is known for authoring the translation of Quran into Russian. His book of recollections Among Arabic Manuscripts was awarded Stalin Prize (in 1951).

Publications
Krachkovsky edited and published the Kitāb al-Aḥbār aṭ-Ṭiwāl ('General History') by Abu Hanifa Dinawari (1912)
Kratschkovsky wrote an article for the Encyclopedia of Islam on Abī Bakr Muḥammad ibn Yaḥyá al-Ṣūlī the author of the Kitāb al-Awrāq.

The British Arabist James Heyworth-Dunne published an edited Arabic text of Kitāb al-Awrāq as three parts, and in his introduction to the third part titled Ashʻār Awlād al-Khulafāʼ wa-Akhbāruhum (1936), he  cites his use of Kratschkovsky's article and refers to communication he had with Kratschkovsky in 1936.

Notes

References

External links
 Ignatii Iulianovich Krachkovskii, The Great Soviet Encyclopedia, 3rd Edition (1970-1979). © 2010 The Gale Group, Inc. All rights reserved.

1883 births
1951 deaths
20th-century translators
Full Members of the Russian Academy of Sciences (1917–1925)
Full Members of the USSR Academy of Sciences
Writers from Vilnius
Translators of the Quran into Russian
Recipients of the Order of Lenin
Russian Arabists
Russian orientalists
Saint Petersburg State University alumni
Soviet Arabists
Stalin Prize winners
Translators from Arabic
Writers from Saint Petersburg